Eastburn–Jeanes Lime Kilns Historic District is a national historic district located near Newark, New Castle County, Delaware.  It encompasses six contributing buildings, two contributing sites, and eight contributing structures.  They are eight line kilns and two abandoned quarries, together with stone buildings erected by Abel Jeanes and Joseph Eastburn. The buildings include the Abel Jeans Manor House, Blacks Mill, horse stable, and outhouse.  They reflect the local lime-burning industry that started in 1816, and operated into the early 1900s.

It was added to the National Register of Historic Places in 1977.

References

External links

Industrial buildings and structures on the National Register of Historic Places in Delaware
Historic districts on the National Register of Historic Places in Delaware
Buildings and structures in Newark, Delaware
Historic districts in New Castle County, Delaware
Historic American Engineering Record in Delaware
Lime kilns in the United States
National Register of Historic Places in New Castle County, Delaware